Grono.net was a social networking service based in Poland. It was referred to as "the Polish equivalent of Facebook" and had over 2 million members.

It featured Internet forums, photo sharing, links to cultural events, an employment website, and an online marketplace for the sale of property.

The site included a freemium model; features for paying subscribers included the ability to moderate forums, take part in competitions, upload more photos and hide advertisements.

It required an invitation from an existing member to register.

History
The website was founded by Wojciech Sobczuk and launched on February 11, 2004.

On 1 July 2012, the service was shut down without warning; it faced financial difficulties due to competition from Facebook.

References

Defunct companies of Poland
Defunct social networking services
Internet properties established in 2004
Internet properties disestablished in 2012